, better known under her stage name  is a Japanese former actress and model. She was a member of the idol duo  (with actress and model Nozomi Maeda).

She resigned from show business on June 14, 2020, citing accusations of slander, sexual crimes, and escape with salary as the reason.

Discography

Singles 

 Note: "Kunekune Bravo!!" and "Magical Lip Kiss" were released on King Records, "Nananananonnon" and "Rock Nananon / Android1617" on Tsubasa Records.

DVD 
  (25 May 2013, Wani Books)

Music videos

Bibliography

Photobooks 
  (27 February 2013, Wani Books)

Filmography

TV dramas 
  (Episode 5, 8 November 2013, TV Asahi) – in the role of Reiko Shimizu

Movies 
 Sadako 3D
  (2014, Alice in Project)– a film shown at the Yubari International Fantastic Film Festival

References

External links 
 
 Pearl Dash Co., Ltd.
 Profile at King Records
 Official blog at Ameblo
  (since 10 December 2013)

Japanese idols
King Records (Japan) artists
Singers from Tokyo
1994 births
Living people
21st-century Japanese singers
21st-century Japanese women singers
Models from Tokyo Metropolis